Jonathan Roufosse (born 10 April 1985) is a French footballer who plays as an attacking midfielder for Paris FC.

References

1985 births
Living people
People from Vitry-sur-Seine
French footballers
Association football midfielders
Louhans-Cuiseaux FC players
Ligue 2 players
Le Havre AC players
Thonon Evian Grand Genève F.C. players
AS Cannes players
AC Arlésien players
Paris FC players
Footballers from Val-de-Marne